The Tyneside Scottish Brigade was raised in 1914 as part of Kitchener's Army. Officially named the 102nd (Tyneside Scottish) Brigade, it contained four Pals battalions from Newcastle-on-Tyne.

Origins
The Tyneside Scottish Brigade was a British First World War infantry brigade. It was formed from men from the Tyneside area of England and even though it was called a Scottish brigade, they accepted any nationality. The request to the War Office to form the brigade was originally turned down, but after a visit to Newcastle upon Tyne by Lord Haldane on 10 October 1915, permission was granted. The complete Tyneside Scottish Brigade of four battalions was raised by 16 November 1915. Reports of bodies of men and groups of miners marching ten miles into the city to enlist are common.

The brigade's four battalions were known as the 1st to 4th Tyneside Scottish.  When taken over by the British Army, these became battalions of the Northumberland Fusiliers as the:
 20th Battalion, Northumberland Fusiliers (1st Tyneside Scottish)
 21st Battalion, Northumberland Fusiliers (2nd Tyneside Scottish)
 22nd Battalion, Northumberland Fusiliers (3rd Tyneside Scottish)
 23rd Battalion, Northumberland Fusiliers (4th Tyneside Scottish)
The reserve battalions were the 29th and 33rd (Reserve) Battalions, Northumberland Fusiliers (Tyneside Scottish).

Active service
Under the command of Brigadier-General T. P. B. Ternan, the Tyneside Scottish Brigade suffered the worst losses of any brigade on 1 July 1916, the first day of the Battle of the Somme; the Tyneside Irish Brigade had the next worst tally of casualties. The 23rd (4th Tyneside Scottish) Battalion lost 629 men (19 officers and 610 other ranks), the third worst battalion loss of the day. The 20th (1st Tyneside Scottish) Battalion lost 584 men and the 22nd (3rd Tyneside Scottish) Battalion, led by Boer War veteran Lt Col Arthur Elphinstone (a former pupil of Monkton Combe School), lost 537 men. All four battalion commanders were killed (the 21st (2nd Tyneside Scottish) commander had been killed shortly before the battle).

Memorial
A memorial was dedicated to the fallen of the Tyneside Scottish Brigade, at La  Boiselle for their part in its capture. It was unveiled by Marshal Ferdinand Foch.

Notes

References
 
 

Pals Brigades of the British Army
Military units and formations in Northumberland
Military units and formations established in 1914
Military units and formations disestablished in 1918
1914 establishments in the United Kingdom
Infantry brigades of the British Army in World War I
Royal Northumberland Fusiliers